Thomas Joseph Campbell (October 27, 1886 – February 28, 1972) was an American banker and football player and coach. He served as the head football coach at Bowdoin College in 1915, at the University of North Carolina at Chapel Hill from 1916 to 1919, and at the University of Virginia in 1922, compiling a career college football record of 16–16–2. Campbell played football at Harvard University, from which he graduated in 1912.

Campbell married Mildred Bell in 1920 in New York.

Coaching career
In 1916 and 1919, Campbell served as the head coach at the University of North Carolina at Chapel Hill, where he compiled a 9–7–1 record. From 1917 to 1918, he served in the military during World War I while North Carolina's football program was suspended. In 1922, Campbell coached at the University of Virginia, tallying a mark of 4–4–1.

Head coaching record

College

References

1886 births
1972 deaths
American bankers
American football halfbacks
Bowdoin Polar Bears football coaches
Harvard Crimson football coaches
Harvard Crimson football players
North Carolina Tar Heels athletic directors
North Carolina Tar Heels football coaches
Virginia Cavaliers football coaches
High school football coaches in New Jersey
United States Army personnel of World War I
People from Gardner, Massachusetts
Sportspeople from Worcester County, Massachusetts